Port Clinton is the name of several places in the United States:

 Port Clinton, Ohio 
 Port Clinton, Pennsylvania 

Outside the continental US:
 Port Clinton, Queensland, in Australia
 Clinton, South Australia, often referred to as Port Clinton in Australia